Muthu Kaalai is a 1995 Tamil-language drama film written and directed by Gokula Krishnan. The film stars Karthik and Soundarya. It was released on 24 February 1995.

Plot 

The film begins with Poochi announcing bad news to Muthu Kaalai. Muthu Kaalai first refuses to see Poonjolai in her deathbed, but he finally accepts.

In the past, Poonjolai was from a rich family in her village, while Muthu Kaalai was a poor herdsman who worked for Raakayi. Since their first meeting, Poonjolai hated him and put him in a lot of troubles. Muthu Kaalai wanted to marry Poonjolai, but her uncles Sakthivel, Sangaiah, and Rathnavel were determined to wipe out his wish.

Cast 

Karthik as Muthu Kaalai
Soundarya as Poonjolai
Napoleon as Sakthivel
Vijayakumar as Sangaiah, Poonjolai's uncle
Chandrasekhar as Rathnavel, Poonjolai's father
Goundamani as Pattayakarar
Senthil
Vadivelu as Poochi
Manorama as Raakayi
Vadivukkarasi as Deivanai
Vaishnavi as Maheshwari
Disco Shanti
Periya Karuppu Thevar
Singamuthu

Production 
The dialogue writer Gokula Krishnan made his directorial debut. He had already worked with Karthik in Varusham 16, Gopura Vasalile and Ponnumani.

Soundtrack 
The music was composed by Ilaiyaraaja, with lyrics written by Vaali.

Reception 
K. Vijayan of New Straits Times stated, "Good acting, characterisation and the director's skills at telling a run-of-the-mill story make this in an above-average movie".

References

External links 

1990s Tamil-language films
1995 directorial debut films
1995 films
Films scored by Ilaiyaraaja